The Ride is a 1994 Czech drama film directed by Jan Svěrák.

Cast
 Anna Geislerová as Anna
 Radek Pastrnák as Radek
 Filip Renc as Honzik
 Jakub Spalek as Franta

Awards
 1995 Crystal Globe (Grand Prix)

References

External links 

1994 films
1994 drama films
Czech Lion Awards winners (films)
1990s drama road movies
Czech drama road movies
1990s Czech-language films